Eusebio Cáceres López (born 10 September 1991 in Onil) is a Spanish track and field athlete who specialises in the long jump.

Career 
He began competing in a wide variety of events at the start of his junior career, including the decathlon. He won the long jump bronze medal at the 2008 World Junior Championships in Athletics. His first senior gold medal in the event soon followed at the 2009 European Team Championships, where he jumped a personal best of eight metres, and he also reached the semi-finals of the 100 metres at the 2009 European Athletics Junior Championships. He helped the Spanish 4×100 metres relay team to sixth in the event final in a national junior record time of 40.03 seconds. Cáceres set the world junior best mark of 5984 points in the indoor heptathlon at the 2010 Spanish junior championships. He chose to compete in his speciality at the 2010 World Junior Championships in Athletics and won the long jump silver medal, finishing behind Luvo Manyonga.

In the long jump qualifying rounds at the 2010 European Athletics Championships, he cleared a European junior record distance of 8.27 m to top the rankings. He failed to repeat that form in the final round, finishing eighth, but his jump remained the best of that year's tournament with the sole exception of Christian Reif's championship record effort of 8.47 m. It was also the second best mark by any European athlete that year, ranking him in the top eight of the discipline worldwide in 2010.

He competed at the 2012 Olympics, but did not reach the final.

He reached the final of the 2013 World Championships, finishing in 4th.  A year later, he also finished in 4th place at the 2014 European Championships.

At the 2020 Olympics, he finished 4th in the men's long jump, having finished 4th in the 2019 European Indoor Championships.

Competition record

1No mark in the final

References

External links
 
 
 
 
 

1991 births
Living people
Spanish male long jumpers
Olympic athletes of Spain
Athletes (track and field) at the 2012 Summer Olympics
Athletes (track and field) at the 2020 Summer Olympics
Spanish Athletics Championships winners
People from Alcoià
Sportspeople from the Province of Alicante